The 1919 College Football All-Southern Team consists of American football players selected to the College Football All-Southern Teams selected by various organizations for the 1919 Southern Intercollegiate Athletic Association football season.

Auburn won the SIAA championship. Even though Centre went undefeated, there were questions over professionalism.

Composite eleven

The composite eleven posted by H. J. Stegeman, coach at the University of Georgia, for Spalding's Football Guide included:
Alf Adams, end for Vanderbilt, also a basketball star and later an attorney.
Pete Bonner, guard for Auburn, selected for various all-time Auburn teams.
Josh Cody, tackle for Vanderbilt, inducted into the College Football Hall of Fame in 1970, only three-time All-American in Vanderbilt football history. He was selected for the Associated Press Southeast Area All-Time football team 1869-1919 era.  Third-team Camp All-American. Later a prominent football coach at many institutions.
Bum Day, center for Georgia, in 1918 as a player for Georgia Tech was the first Southern player selected first-team All-American by Walter Camp.
Bill Fincher, end/tackle for Georgia Tech, a unanimous selection and this year the third Southern player selected first-team All-American by Walter Camp, inducted into the College Football Hall of Fame in 1974. He also kicked.
Buck Flowers, halfback for Georgia Tech, inducted into the College Football Hall of Fame in 1955. He was selected for the Associated Press Southeast Area All-Time football team 1869-1919 era. He also kicked. 
Judy Harlan, fullback for Georgia Tech, came into his own upon returning to Tech for the 1919 season, "the line plunger almost unfailingly good for "must" yardage to keep a drive rolling."
Mullie Lenoir, halfback for Alabama, later coach of the Bluefield Rams.
Bo McMillin, quarterback for Centre, the second Southern player selected first-team All-American by Walter Camp, inducted into the College Football Hall of Fame in 1951.
Artie Pew, tackle for Georgia, member of teams which over two years (1920 and 1921) did not lose to a single southern opponent. He also kicked. Pew was also a basketball player. 
Fatty Warren, guard for Auburn. He also kicked.

All-Southerns of 1919

Ends

Alf Adams, Vanderbilt 
Bill Fincher, Georgia Tech (College Football Hall of Fame) 
Al Staton, Georgia Tech 
Terry Snoddy, Centre 
Tom Zerfoss, Vanderbilt 
Jack Hovater, Alabama 
Rodney Ollinger, Auburn 
Owen Reynolds, Georgia 
John A. Wight, Tulane 
W. R. Bower, Mississippi A & M 
Oliver Daves, Washington and Lee 
Monk Mattox, Washington and Lee

Tackles

Josh Cody, Vanderbilt (College Football Hall of Fame) 
Pete Bonner, Auburn 
Artie Pew, Georgia 
Sully Montgomery, Centre 
Turner Bethel, Washington and Lee 
Babe Carpenter, Mississippi A & M 
Bill James, Centre

Guards
Fatty Warren, Auburn 
Dummy Lebey, Georgia Tech 
Ike Rogers, Alabama 
Tom Lipscomb, Vanderbilt 
Yen Lightsey, Clemson 
Ham Dowling, Georgia Tech 
Howard Van Antwerp, Centre 
Tom Dutton, LSU 
R. N. Henley, Mississippi A&M 
Tram Sessions, Alabama 
Ralph Lee Jones, Alabama 
Daddy Potts, Clemson

Centers

Bum Day, Georgia 
Pup Phillips, Georgia Tech 
Red Weaver*, Centre 
Tram Sessions, Alabama 
Noah Caton, Auburn 
Dad Amis, Georgia Tech

Quarterbacks
Bo McMillin*, Centre (College Football Hall of Fame) 
Jim Mattox, Washington and Lee 
Speedy Speer, Furman 
Charles Scott, Auburn 
Stumpy Banks, Clemson 
Swayne Latham, Vanderbilt 
Marshall Guill, Georgia Tech

Halfbacks

Buck Flowers, Georgia Tech (College Football Hall of Fame) 
Mullie Lenoir, Alabama 
Riggs Stephenson, Alabama 
Norris Armstrong, Centre 
Red Barron, Georgia Tech 
Grailey Berryhill, Vanderbilt 
Willis McCabe, Tennessee 
Red Howard, Auburn 
Sam Raines, Washington & Lee 
Bill Coughlan, Sewanee

Fullbacks
Judy Harlan, Georgia Tech 
Red Roberts, Centre 
Russell, Mississippi A&M

Key
Bold = Composite selection

* = Consensus All-American

S = composite eleven posted by H. J. Stegeman, coach at University of Georgia, for Spalding's Football Guide.

NYS = All-SIAA consensus of various Southern newspapers, published in the New York Sun.

CR = selected by Charles A. Reinhart, sporting editor for the Louisville Courier-Journal.

H = selected by John Heisman, coach at the Georgia Institute of Technology.

MB = selected by Morgan Blake, sporting editor Atlanta Journal.

NT = selected by the writers of the Nashville Tennessean.

JLR = selected by J. L. Ray, sporting editor for the Tennessean.

ST = selected by Stuart Towe, of the Knoxville Journal and Tribune.

D = selected by Mike Donahue, coach at Auburn University.

WGF = selected by W. G. Foster, sporting editor for the Chattanooga Times.

ZN = selected by Zipp Newman of the Birmingham News.

LR = selected by Les Raislinas of the Atlanta Constitution.

FA = selected by Frank Anderson, coach at Oglethorpe University.

BR = selected by Bill Raftery, coach at Washington and Lee University.

X = selected by Xen C. Scott, coach at University of Alabama.

MJ = selected by the Montgomery Journal.

BD = selected by Bruce Dudley, sporting editor of the Louisville Herald.

See also
1919 College Football All-America Team

References

1919 Southern Intercollegiate Athletic Association football season
College Football All-Southern Teams